Joseph Gilbert Fates (September 29, 1914, Newark, New Jersey - May 1, 2000, New York City) was an American television producer.

Fates was the executive producer of What's My Line? Fates produced the game show during its entire quarter-century span of CBS and syndicated runs. Fates and panelist Arlene Francis (who debuted on the second week) were with the show from 1950 until it ended in 1975. Fates also hosted CBS Television Quiz, the first television game show ever to be broadcast regularly; and was credited as a creative consultant on Play Your Cards Right, the British version of Goodson-Todman's Card Sharks. Before World War II, he was a stage actor. He also wrote a book in 1978 called What's My Line? The History of America's Most Famous Panel Show.

References

External links
 

1914 births
2000 deaths
American male stage actors
American male television actors
American television directors
American television producers
American television writers
American male television writers
American information and reference writers
American game show hosts
Businesspeople from Newark, New Jersey
20th-century American male actors
20th-century American businesspeople
Screenwriters from New Jersey
20th-century American screenwriters
20th-century American male writers